Serdang Bedagai Regency is a regency in the Eastern shores of North Sumatra facing Malaysia, with 95 km of coastline and covering an area of 1,900.22 square kilometres, divided into seventeen districts (kecamatan), in turn subdivided into 243 villages (237 rural desa and 6 urban kelurahan). Its seat is Sei Rampah. The regency surrounds the independent city of Tebing Tinggi, and also contains a district (kecamatan) by the same name (Tebing Tinggi District surrounds the city on its west side, while Tebing Syahbandar District surrounds the city on its east side). The name “Serdang Bedagai” was derived from the two Sultanates which formerly existed in the Region; they were Serdang Sultanate and Padang Bedagai Sultanate. The population was 592,922 at the 2010 Census, while the 2020 Census produced a total of 657,490.

Location 

To the north is the Malacca Straits, to the west is Deli Serdang Regency (surrounding Medan), to the south and southeast is Simalungun Regency, and to the east are the Buaya River and Ular River bordering Batubara Regency, which was formed in 2006 from the western part of the Asahan Regency.

Administration 
The Serdang Bedagai Regency is divided administratively into seventeen districts (kecamatan), tabulated below with their areas and their populations at the 2010 Census and the 2020 Census. The table also includes the locations of the district administrative centres, the numbers of administrative villages in each district and its post code.

References

External links 

 

Regencies of North Sumatra